Elena Bonetti (born 12 April 1974) is an Italian politician and mathematician who served as Minister for Family and Equal Opportunities between 2019 and 2022.

Biography
Elena Bonetti was born on 12 April 1974 in Asola, Lombardy. She graduated from the University of Pavia in 1997 and, in 2002, obtained her PhD at the University of Milan, where she has served as Associate Professor of Mathematical Analysis. She studied partial differential equations and predictive modelling.

She has had some involvement in scouting and has served as a member of Associazione Guide e Scouts Cattolici Italiani. In 2014, she signed an appeal, together with presbyter Andrea Gallo, to ask the Italian state to recognize same-sex marriage.

She entered politics in 2017 as a candidate in the Democratic Party leadership election. Spotted by Prime Minister of Italy Matteo Renzi, she was named the national manager for youth and training.

In 2018, she was a candidate for the Chamber of Deputies, listed third on the Democratic Party's Lombardy list without being elected.

On 5 September 2019, Elena Bonetti was appointed the Italian Minister for Family and Equal Opportunities. in the Conte II Cabinet.

References

1974 births
Living people
Politicians from the Province of Mantua
21st-century Italian politicians
21st-century Italian women politicians
Women government ministers of Italy
University of Pavia alumni
University of Milan alumni
Democratic Party (Italy) politicians
Italia Viva politicians
Conte II Cabinet
Draghi Cabinet
People from Asola, Lombardy